This Man, according to a website created in 2008 by Italian marketer Andrea Natella named Ever Dream This Man?, refers to a person who was claimed to have been repeatedly seen in dreams worldwide since 2006, but was never found in the real world. Natella created the site in 2008, but it was not until October 2009 that it gained attention from the press and online internet users. This Man's notoriety spawned several internet memes that spoofed flyers of the website, references in films and television shows like The X-Files, and a manga series based on the hoax by Weekly Shonen Magazine.

Story of the man 

According to the storyline, later on, in January 2006 until today more than 3,000 people from other major cities across the world such as Los Angeles, Berlin, São Paulo, Tehran, Beijing, London, Rome, Dhaka, Barcelona, Durban, Stockholm, Dubai, Guadalajara, Pattaya, Sydney, Amman, Ottawa, Paris, Lisbon, Singapore City, Prague, Riyadh, Tokyo, Karachi, New Delhi, Moscow, Lagos, and Busan claimed to have seen the man while sleeping. Also according to the storyline, those who dreamed him, who remained anonymous, suggest he was a Brazilian school teacher who had six fingers on his right hand. These dreamers' experiences of the man varied from romantic, sexual, violence, crime, corruption, deadly situations to flying with the man to just seeing him staring at the dreamer and doing nothing.

Andrea Natella, when interviewed by Vice magazine for an article that took the myth seriously (thus making Natella answer the questions as if for real), explained that he first dreamed This Man before he was aware of who he really was; it was in the winter of 2008, and This Man, "invited [him] to create a website to find an answer to his own appearance." Following This Man's instructions, he not only made the site but also produced the mysterious man's identikit using the mobile device application Ultimate Flash Face.

An actual living human that looked like This Man was never identified, and there were some who dreamed of him who had no relationship with others also seeing him in their dreams. His voice was also unidentifiable, as it is much harder for someone to remember the audio part of a dream than the visual; it was also rare for him to speak in the dreams. However, Natella claimed that he received letters and emails that compared This Man's look to that of fictional characters such as The Man from Another Place and The Dummy and famous real-life figures such as Andrew Lloyd Webber. He also claimed that some, including an Indian guru named Arud Kannan Ayya, claimed themselves to be This Man, but with no evidence.

ThisMan.org suggested five theories of the phenomenon:
 This Man was an example of Carl Jung's concept of the unconscious "archetypal image" people see during very difficult life situations.
 This Man was a manifestation of God.
 A corporation was mentally conditioning multiple people to dream the same man.
 Some people dreamt the man only after learning about others seeing him.
 Because it is hard for humans to remember people's faces in dreams, people are inaccurately using Natella's identikit of This Man to describe the person in their recurring dreams.

Popularity 
The story of This Man started gaining attention from internet users and the press in 2009. It was not until October of that year that views of the site skyrocketed. In a short period of time, it garnered more than two million visits and 10,000-plus emails from others sharing experiences with This Man and sending photos of those who looked like him. On October 12, 2009, comedian Tim Heidecker made a Twitter post about This Man, tweeting that it was "scaring the shit outta me." While Natella's previous marketing stunts only garnered local attention, This Man was the first time he performed a stunt that spread across the globe.

Debunk 
Upon This Man's initial widespread exposure, there was suspicion from not only 4chan users but also blogs like ASSME and io9 that it was a guerrilla-marketing stunt, as they discovered ThisMan.org was hosted by the same company that also hosted a site named guerrila marketing it, "a fake advertising agency which designed subversive hoaxes and created weird art projects exploring pornography, politics, and advertising", described Natella. Nonetheless, some sources presented the argument of it being a hoax as simply being one side of the discussion instead of a real fact. However, a 2010 post from the "artgency" website Kook, which Natella became a partner of while This Man was gaining traction, and a published paper he wrote in 2012 titled "Viral 'K' Marketing" finally confirmed that This Man was not real but rather a stunt.

While Natella admitted ThisMan.org was simply a marketing ploy, he never revealed what it was promoting; however, some sources, including The Kernel, suggest that it was meant to promote a film of the same name by Bryan Bertino, writer and director of The Strangers (2008). If the press release for the film is any indication, it would have been about a person who hears about other people he has never met before dreaming about him. Ghost House Pictures bought ThisMan.org in May 2010 and announced that they were writing and directing a film about This Man, with Bertino contracted as writer/director. No further announcement has since been made about the film.

Even after Natella's confirmations, serious coverage of This Man continued into the mid-2010s from publications like Vice magazine. Vice contacted the site, and Natella answered questions as if the site was not a hoax. However, on the same day the magazine published its interview with Natella, it released an announcement to its readers that This Man was not real: "we run a story, it turns out to be something that was denounced in 2009 and could be easily verified as fake with a single google, a few people call us dickheads and the editorial team drown in their own tears."

Analysis 
io9 writer Annalee Newitz called This Man "Natella's greatest masterwork", reasoning that it was only "uncanny", "cheesy and a little bit scary" instead of having "artsy pseudo-intellectual politics" like a lot of his other art does." Vice explained that while This Man does not exist, he "properly looks like the kind of dude you might see in a dream", where "he pats you on the back[,] you feel warm and nostalgic[, and] you wake up." A 2014 article from the fringe science website Mysterious Universe claims that people experiencing the same type of dreams is possible; it cites not only Jung's archetypal theory but also Ervin László's pseudoscientific theory of the Akashic Field: "should it prove true that our thoughts do not reside within our own heads, but rather exist in the ether, then couldn't some of us be accessing the same information in our subconscious during dreams?" Vice described the purpose of the hoax as "Kind of like Inception but with memes", as it "prim[ed] people to dream what they've never dreamed before."

In other media 

Upon This Man's initial popularity, internet users posted several internet memes spoofing flyers for the myth, which replaced This Man's facial compositions with head shots of famous figures such as Robbie Rotten, Karl Marx, and Barack Obama. Comedy Central also produced their own parody of the flyer that used Daniel Tosh's face.

This Man's identikit makes brief appearances in the beginning of the 2017 South Korean film Lucid Dream and The X-Files episode "Plus One", where it is on the upper right part of a photo of The Lone Gunmen seen previously in the show without it.

The MMORPG Rift has a set of collectibles inspired by This Man called "Twisted: The Dream Traveler" in its Nightmare Tide expansion.

In 2018, Weekly Shōnen Magazine began running a manga based on This Man and named after the hoax. Illustrated by Kouji Megumi of Bloody Monday fame and written by Karin Sora, it follows a police officer named Hakaru Amano and his case that involves the urban legend of This Man. The first volume ran from April 25, 2018, to April 3, 2019.

The 2019 video game AI: The Somnium Files included cameo appearances of This Man in two of its puzzle segments. Players are awarded a trophy should they see him on both of these occasions.

In 2022, the Shōnen Jump+ manga series Dandadan included a cameo appearance of This Man during chapter 83.

References

External links 
 "This Man (Ever Dream This Man?)" at Know Your Meme
 guerrigliamarketing.it, a site that was hosted by the same company that hosted ThisMan.com
 Ever dream man in vatan -v (Persian)

2010s unfinished films
2018 manga
Internet hoaxes
Cancelled films
Internet memes
Promotion and marketing communications
Unfinished films
Unreleased films
Unreleased American films
Urban legends
The X-Files (franchise)
Creepypasta